Nikolay Gennadiyevich Basov (14 December 1922 – 1 July 2001) was a Soviet physicist and educator. For his fundamental work in the field of quantum electronics that led to the development of laser and maser, Basov shared the 1964 Nobel Prize in Physics with Alexander Prokhorov and Charles Hard Townes.

Early life
Basov was born in the town of Usman, now in Lipetsk Oblast in 1922. He finished school in 1941 in Voronezh, and was later called for military service at Kuibyshev Military Medical Academy. In 1943 he left the academy and served in the Red Army participating in the Second World War with the 1st Ukrainian Front.

Professional career
Basov graduated from Moscow Engineering Physics Institute (MEPhI) in 1950. He then held a professorship at MEPhI and also worked in the Lebedev Physical Institute (LPI), where he defended a dissertation for the Candidate of Sciences degree (equivalent to PhD) in 1953 and a dissertation for the Doctor of Sciences degree in 1956. Basov was the Director of the LPI in 1973–1988. He was elected as  corresponding member of the USSR Academy of Sciences (Russian Academy of Sciences since 1991) in 1962 and  Full Member of the Academy in 1966. In 1967, he was elected a Member of the Presidium of the Academy (1967—1990), and since 1990 he was the councillor of the Presidium of the USSR Academy of Sciences. In 1971 he was elected a Member of the German Academy of Sciences Leopoldina. He was Honorary President and Member of the International Academy of Science, Munich. He was the head of the laboratory of quantum radiophysics at the LPI until his death in 2001.

In the early 1950s Basov and Prokhorov developed theoretical grounds for creation of a molecular oscillator and constructed such an oscillator based on ammonia. Later this oscillator became known as maser. They also proposed a method for the production of population inversion using inhomogeneous electric and magnetic fields. Their results were presented at a national conference in 1952 and published in 1954. Basov then proceeded to the development of laser, an analogous generator of coherent light. In 1955 he designed a three-level laser, and in 1959 suggested constructing a semiconductor laser, which he built with collaborators in 1963.

Basov's contributions to the development of the laser and maser, which won him the Nobel Prize in 1964, also led to new missile defense initiatives.

He died on 1 July, 2001 at Moscow and was buried at Novodevichy Cemetery.

Politics
He entered politics in 1951 and became a member of parliament (the Soviet of the Union of the Supreme Soviet) in 1974. Following U.S. President Ronald Reagan's speech on SDI in 1983, Basov signed a letter along with other Soviet scientists condemning the initiative, which was published in the New York Times. In 1985 he declared the Soviet Union was capable of matching SDI proposals made by the U.S.

Books
N. G. Basov, K. A. Brueckner (Editor-in-Chief), S. W. Haan, C. Yamanaka. Inertial Confinement Fusion, 1992, Research Trends in Physics Series published by the American Institute of Physics Press (presently Springer, New York). .
V. Stefan and N. G. Basov (Editors). Semiconductor Science and Technology, Volume 1. Semiconductor Lasers. (Stefan University Press Series on Frontiers in Science and Technology) (Paperback), 1999. .
V. Stefan and N. G. Basov (Editors). Semiconductor Science and Technology, Volume 2: Quantum Dots and Quantum Wells. (Stefan University Press Series on Frontiers in Science and Technology) (Paperback), 1999. .

Awards and honours

 Lenin Prize (1959)
 Nobel Prize in Physics (1964, with the pioneering work done in the field of quantum electronics)
 Hero of Socialist Labour — twice (1969, 1982)
 Gold Medal of the Czechoslovak Academy of Sciences (1975)
 A. Volta Gold Medal (1977)
 Kalinga Prize (1986)
 USSR State Prize (1989)
 Lomonosov Grand Gold Medal, Moscow State University (1990)
 Order of Lenin – five times
 Order of Merit for the Fatherland, 2nd class
 Order of the Patriotic War, 2nd class

See also
Excimer laser
Maser
Alexander Prokhorov
Lebedev Institute of Physics
Michelson interferometer

References

External links

Basov's grave
Detailed biography 
  including the Nobel Lecture, 11 December 1964 Semiconductor Lasers
 Oral History interview transcript with Nikolay Basov on 14 September 1984, American Institute of Physics, Niels Bohr Library and Archives

1922 births
2001 deaths
People from Usman, Russia
Full Members of the USSR Academy of Sciences
Full Members of the Russian Academy of Sciences
Foreign Members of the Bulgarian Academy of Sciences
Foreign Fellows of the Indian National Science Academy
Heroes of Socialist Labour
Lenin Prize winners
Nobel laureates in Physics
Recipients of the Order "For Merit to the Fatherland", 2nd class
Soviet Nobel laureates
Recipients of the USSR State Prize
Recipients of the Order of Lenin
Soviet physicists
Optical physicists
Laser researchers
Soviet inventors
Soviet military personnel of World War II
Spectroscopists
Commanders of the Order of Merit of the Republic of Poland
Recipients of the Lomonosov Gold Medal
Burials at Novodevichy Cemetery
Members of the German Academy of Sciences Leopoldina
Moscow Engineering Physics Institute alumni
Members of the German Academy of Sciences at Berlin
Kalinga Prize recipients